Paula's Best Dishes is an American cooking show hosted by Paula Deen on Food Network

On June 21, 2013, the Food Network announced that they would not renew Deen's contract due to controversy surrounding Deen's use of a racial slur and racist jokes in her restaurant, effectively cancelling the series. As of 2017, culinary icon Paula Deen has a new show, Positively Paula that's syndicated and is available in over 130 million homes.

Background
Debuting on June 8, 2008, the show stars Paula Deen as she helps rescue viewer recipes, prepare dishes and shares stories.

Episodes

References

External links
 Official website
 
 

2008 American television series debuts
2000s American cooking television series
2010s American cooking television series
2013 American television series endings
Food Network original programming
English-language television shows